The Battle on the Beas took place in March 1765, between the Durranis and the Sikh Misls as part of the Afghan-Sikh wars during Ahmad Shah Abdali's return home. The battle which took place on the seventh day of the ongoing harassment by the Sikhs, ended without any conclusion.

Background
On Ahmad Shah Abdali’s return home, he crossed river Sutlej, entering Jullundur Doab and laid camp on the bank of the river.  Throughout the march through the Jullundur Doab from the bank of Sutlej to Chenab river, the Durranis were harassed and assaulted for seven days where the Sikhs returned again and again only to retire in same prevalence, as this was their usual war tactic. Battle on the Sutlej was the first day of harassment and Battle on the Beas occurred on the seventh and the final day of the march through the Jullundur Doab. Before the battle on the Beas, the Durranis lost a heavy number of causalities of Afghan soldiers during the skirmish against the Sikhs.

After sunrise, the Durranis marched and quickly reached the bank of Beas and ordered all the goods, resources, animals and civilians to first cross the river and right after everything was crossed, Ahmad Shah Abdali and his soldiers began preparation to cross as well when they were notified that 30,000 Sikhs had gathered on the southern bank of the river.

Battle
Ahmad Shah ordered all his commanders to take their positions and soon the Sikhs arrived, created havoc, attacking from all sides. Ahmad Shah charged at them with all of his army but the Sikhs according to their usual war tactics retired and they were pursued for 10 km before returning on the bank of the river. According to historian Hari Ram Gupta, the Sikhs didn't pursue Ahmad Shah because of their wish to attend the occasion of Vaisakhi festival whereas historian Ganda Singh (historian) mentions that Sikhs retired to plan the preparation for attacking Lahore as Ahmad Shah Abdali departs. Even Qazi Nur Muhammad, who was brought along by Ahmad Shah to write down accounts of his master's campaign in return for some territories, repeatedly mentioned that the Sikhs would come again and again and after the attack they would retire as this was their war tactic and by no means should their retirement be mistaken as it wouldn't be considered an actual retirement.

Aftermath
After crossing the river, Ahmad Shah Abdali and his troops, crossed Ravi river but while crossing Chenab river by end of March 1765, Ahmad Shah faced heavy devastation and destruction with loss of baggages, properties, animals, resources, treasure, men and women, when crossing the stream that was violent, deep and had overflowing strong currents. During such horror and chaos, there was great loss of lives and no one cared about anyone where even the mothers and fathers abandoned their children. After crossing the river, Ahmad Shah crossed another river, Jhelum, finally making it back to Afghanistan, while Nasir Khan of Qalat left for his country.

On the other hand, the Sikhs met during the Vaisakhi festival on 10 April 1765 and with confidence generated after having upper hand in the battles during Ahmad Shah Abdali's seventh campaign, the Sikhs attacked and captured Lahore on 16 April 1765.

References 

Battles involving the Durrani Empire
Battles involving the Sikhs